The 2009 Rostelecom Cup was the second event of six in the 2009–10 ISU Grand Prix of Figure Skating, a senior-level international invitational competition series. It was held at the Megasport Arena in Moscow on October 22–25. Medals were awarded in the disciplines of men's singles, ladies' singles, pair skating, and ice dancing. Skaters earned points toward qualifying for the 2009–10 Grand Prix Final. The compulsory dance was the Tango Romantica.

The event was renamed in 2009 after Rostelecom, the sponsor of Russian Figure Skating Federation.

Results

Men

Ladies

Pairs

Ice dancing

References

External links

 
 
 

Rostelecom Cup, 2009
Rostelecom Cup
Rostelecom Cup
Rostelecom